The Symphony No. 87 in A major, Hoboken I/87, is the last of the six Paris Symphonies (numbers 82–87) written by Franz Joseph Haydn.  It was written in 1786, but performed in 1787 by the Concert de la Loge Olympique, after having been commissioned for performance there by Count d'Ogney in 1785.

Movements
The work is in standard four movement form and scored for flute, two oboes, two bassoons, two horns, continuo (harpsichord) and strings.
Vivace, 
Adagio,  in D major
Menuet e trio, 
Finale: Vivace, 

The trio of the Minuet prominently features the solo oboe which rises a high E.

Notes

References
Robbins Landon, H. C. (1963) Joseph Haydn:  Critical Edition of the Complete Symphonies, Universal Edition, Vienna.
Steinberg, Michael (1995) The Symphony: A Listener's Guide.  Oxford University Press.
Harrison, Bernard Haydn: The "Paris" Symphonies (Cambridge University Press, 1998)

Symphony 087
Compositions in A major
1786 compositions